is a former Japanese football player. He last played for Honda FC. Honda previously played for Avispa Fukuoka in the J2 League.

Club statistics
Updated to 1 March 2018.

References

External links

1987 births
Living people
Association football people from Kumamoto Prefecture
Japanese footballers
J1 League players
J2 League players
J3 League players
Japan Football League players
Avispa Fukuoka players
Japan Soccer College players
Matsumoto Yamaga FC players
Zweigen Kanazawa players
Honda FC players
Association football midfielders